The 2003 European Women Sevens Championship – the first edition of the European Women's Sevens Championship. It took place on 24 May 2003 at Lunel.

It was Spain who take home the first European Women's Sevens Championship after defeating France 21-12.

Pool Stage

Pool A

Pool B

Knockout stage

Bowl

Plate

Cup

References

2003
European Women Sevens Championship
sevens
European Women Sevens Championship
International women's rugby union competitions hosted by France
rugby union
European Women Sevens Championship